Suzanne Mary Packer AO (born circa 1942) is a paediatrician and advocate for the rights of children. She was granted Officer of the Order of Australia in 2021 for "distinguished service to children through roles in health, welfare and protection initiatives"  and previously a member of the Order of Australia in 1999 for "services to child welfare, paediatrics and the public". As of 2021 she is a clinical senior lecturer at ANU Medical School, Australian National University.

Education and career 
Packer grew up in the Blue Mountains and attended Sydney University for her undergraduate degree. She then continued to do practical training in obstetrics and paediatrics at St Vincent’s Hospital. In 1972 she qualified as a specialist paediatrician and has worked as a community paediatrician with a special interest in child abuse and abuse prevention since 1990.

Awards 

 Officer of the Order of Australia – Queen's Birthday honours, 2021  
 ACT Senior Australian of the Year, 2019  
 Canberra Citizen of the Year, 2013 
 Children's Week special award, 2005

References 

1940s births
Living people
Australian paediatricians
Officers of the Order of Australia
Sydney Medical School alumni
Academic staff of the Australian National University